The 1933 East Fife by-election was held on Thursday, 2 February 1933.  The by-election was held due to the death of the sitting National Liberal MP, Sir James Duncan Millar. It was won by the National Liberal candidate James Henderson Stewart.

Candidates
27 year-old David Edwin Keir stood as an Independent Liberal candidate. Keir had stood for the Liberals at the 1929 Midlothian and Peebles Northern by-election and also contested the same seat at the 1929 general election. He was the Liberal candidate for Roxburgh and Selkirk at the 1931 general election, and was the son of the Rev. T. Keir of Dumfries, and was educated at Dumfries Academy and the University of Edinburgh. He was a journalist.

Result

Anderson, running under the Agricultural Party, attracted many of his votes from Unionists who regretted not being able to field a candidate of their own due to the political pact with the National Liberals.

References

1933 elections in the United Kingdom
1933 in Scotland
1930s elections in Scotland
Politics of Fife
Fife, East
20th century in Fife